The 1864 United States presidential election in California took place on November 8, 1864, as part of the 1864 United States presidential election. State voters chose five electors of the Electoral College, who voted for president and vice president.

California voted for the Republican incumbent, Abraham Lincoln, over the Democratic challenger, Union Army Major General George B. McClellan.

Results

References

California
1864
1864 California elections